Tundri is a very big village in the Dabhara tahsil; it is located in the Janjgir Chanpa District in Chhattisgarh, India. According to the 2001 census, 2,865 people lived in the village. The population has now grown to approximately 6,000.

Geography and Climate 
It is located 17 km from Dabhara and 70 km from the district capital Janjgir Champa. It lies 178 km away from the state capital of Raipur.

Education
Tundri has seven schools:
 Gov Higher Secondary School Jherabhata (Tundri) 
 Sarswti Sishu Mandir
 Saskiya Kanya Shala
 Gov Middle School Jherabhata
 Gov Primary School Beladula
 Gov Primary School Kanchanpur
 Agape Mission School

References

Villages in Janjgir-Champa district